Lee Grodzins (born July 10, 1926) is an American professor emeritus of physics at the Massachusetts Institute of Technology (MIT). After work as a researcher at Brookhaven National Laboratory, Grodzins joined the faculty of MIT, where he taught physics for nearly four decades.  He was also head of R&D for Niton Corporation, which developed devices to detect dangerous contaminants and contraband. He has written more than 150 technical papers and holds more than 60 US patents.

Education and early life
Grodzins was born in Lowell, Massachusetts, the son of David Melvin Grodzins and his wife Taube Grodzins, Jewish emigrants, with roots in Poland and Grodno, Belarus. The family settled in Manchester, New Hampshire. He graduated with a BS degree in engineering in 1946 from the University of New Hampshire. He began his career with General Electric as an assistant in the nuclear physics group at their research laboratory in Schenectady, New York. He earned his PhD in physics at Purdue University in 1954 and taught for a year afterwards at Purdue.

Career and research

From 1955 to 1958, Grodzins was a researcher with the nuclear physics group at Brookhaven National Laboratory, probing the properties of the nuclei of atoms. In 1956 he married a biologist whom he met at Brookhaven, Lulu  Anderson (1929– 2019). This work was important in our understanding of the weak interaction. Grodzins joined the faculty of the Physics department of MIT in 1959 and was a Professor of Physics there from 1966 to 1998. In 1985, he carried out the first computer axial tomographic experiment using synchrotron radiation.

Meanwhile, in 1987, he co-founded and led research and development at Niton Corporation, which developed, manufactured and marketed test kits and instruments to measure radon gas in buildings and toxic elements, such as lead. There he also developed handheld devices that use X-ray fluorescence to determine the composition of metal alloys and to detect other materials. In 1998, he left MIT to work full-time directing the R&D group at Niton, and in 2005, he and his family sold Niton. His sister Ethel was the President and CEO of Niton. He also developed devices to detect explosives, drugs and other contraband in luggage and cargo containers. Four of his devices have earned R&D 100 awards, given annually by R&D Magazine to the 100 most innovative technical products in the US.

Grodzins has written more than 150 technical papers and holds more than 50 US patents. He was a Guggenheim Fellow in 1964–65 and in 1971–72, and a Senior Alexander von Humboldt Fellow in 1980–81. He is a Fellow of the American Physical Society and the American Academy of Arts and Sciences. He received an honorary Doctor of Science degree from Purdue University in 1998. He is a founding member of the Union of Concerned Scientists and was its president in 1972. In 1999, he founded Cornerstones of Science, a public library initiative to help children and adults explore science. He serves as its president. MIT has named the Lee Grodzins Postdoctoral Fellows Lecture Award for him.

Personal life
His sister Anne Grodzins Lipow was a librarian and library science expert, and his sister Ethel Grodzins Romm was an author, project manager, CEO and Co-Chair of the Lyceum Society of the New York Academy of Sciences.

References

External links
 Grodzins describes Cornerstones of Science's vision (2015)

1926 births
Brookhaven National Laboratory staff
Massachusetts Institute of Technology School of Science faculty
University of New Hampshire alumni
Purdue University alumni
Members of the United States National Academy of Sciences
21st-century American physicists
American nuclear physicists
Living people